El Elegido (born November 23, 1975) is a Mexican luchador enmascarado, or masked professional wrestler. Elegido is best known for his appearances with the Mexican professional wrestling promotion AAA, where he has worked primarily as a tecnico (a face, or those that portray the "good guys") and for a while as a member of the rudo (Heel, those that portray the "bad guys") stable Los Mirreyes alongside Alan Stone and Toscano. He has also worked for International Wrestling Revolution Group and smaller independent groups.

In 2007, Elegido was among several luchadors that represented AAA in an inter-promotional show with Pro Wrestling Noah at the Differ Ariake Arena.

He is known for his entrances consisting of him somersaulting from all four ring corners after raising both arms in the air at each corner. His gear consists of a black mask with a Celtic cross on the forehead of the mask, and black trunks. His ring name is Spanish for "The Chosen One"

Professional wrestling career 

Elegido debuted on March 20, 2006. He became a regular with AAA that year.

He often teamed with El Intocable, who had a similar gimmick and often competed against various members of Los Guapos VIP.

On July 15, 2007, he competed in his first Triplemanía at Triplemanía XV, picking up the win in a trios against Los Guapos VIP.

On March 15, 2009, he was defeated in the semifinals of the Rey de Reyes tournament. In 2009, he also teamed with Gronda II in Gronda's short feud against the original "Gronda", Groon XXX.

On October 1, 2010, he competed in a Torneo cibernetico match with the stipulation that he would lose his mask if he was final person pinned. While he did get pinned, he was able to escape the match with his mask intact.

As of February 2017, despite competing in AAA for over 10 years, he has yet to win any AAA titles.

He competed at Rey de Reyes (2017) for the Rey de Reyes sword. the also match also included La Parka , Argenis , Averno , Pimpinela Escarlata , Niño Hamburguesa , Joe Líder , Chessman , which Argenis won

Championships and accomplishments 
 Pro Wrestling Illustrated
 PWI ranked him #170 of the 500 best singles wrestlers of the PWI 500 in 2009

Luchas de Apuestas record

Notes

References

External links
El Elegido at The Accelerator's Wrestling Rollercoaster
El Elegido at Cagematch.net

El Elegido at Wrestlingdata.com
Professional wrestling record for El Elegido from The Internet Wrestling Database

1975 births
Masked wrestlers
Mexican male professional wrestlers
Living people
Unidentified wrestlers
Professional wrestlers from Nuevo León
People from Monterrey